Kenneth Ray Keller (September 12, 1934 – December 10, 1997) was a professional American football running back who played in the National Football League for two seasons. He played college football at North Carolina.

Early life
Keller was born and grew up in Salina, Pennsylvania, and attended Bell Township High School, where he was part of a football team that won 28 straight games from 1948 to 1951.

College career
Keller was a member of the North Carolina Tar Heels football team for four seasons. In football he played running back, defensive back, placekicker and was a return specialist. Keller led the team in total offense in 1953 and 1955 and in scoring for three straight seasons. He finished his collegiate career with over 2,000 all-purpose yards and over 100 total points scored. Keller was also a starting outfielder for the baseball team.

Professional career
Keller was drafted in the 11th round of the 1956 NFL Draft by the Philadelphia Eagles. Keller served as the Eagles' starting running back as a rookie and led the team with 433 rushing yards and four rushing touchdowns. He tore ligaments in his knee in the second-to-last game of the season against the Washington Redskins. Keller rushed for 195 yards on 43 carries in a reduced role in 1957.

References

1934 births
1997 deaths
People from Westmoreland County, Pennsylvania
Players of American football from Pennsylvania
American football running backs
North Carolina Tar Heels football players
North Carolina Tar Heels baseball players
Philadelphia Eagles players